Scrobipalpula parachiquitella is a moth in the family Gelechiidae. It was described by Povolný in 1968. It is found on Cuba.

References

Scrobipalpula
Moths described in 1968